Claudin-10 is a protein that in humans is encoded by the CLDN10 gene. It belongs to the group of claudins.

This gene encodes a member of the claudin family. Claudins are integral membrane proteins and components of tight junction strands. Tight junction strands serve as a physical barrier to prevent solutes and water from passing freely through the paracellular space between epithelial or endothelial cell sheets. Two alternatively spliced transcript variants that encode different isoforms have been identified for this gene.

References

External links

Further reading

 

Biology of bipolar disorder